Anju Kurian is an Indian actress and model who appears mainly in Malayalam and Tamil films. Best known for her roles in the 2016 Malayalam film Kavi Uddheshichathu and the 2018 film Njan Prakashan. But, She critically acclaimed for her role as Ramya in 2019 Tamil film Igloo.

Career
She started her career in the Malayalam film industry with a supporting role in the movie Neram which was directed by Alphonse Puthren. The following year, she played a supporting cast Ohm Shanthi Oshaana. In 2016, She made her debut as female lead in Kavi Uddheshichathu..? directed by Thomas Kutty & Liju Thomas. She has also acted in several short films and musical videos.

Filmography

Films

Other works

Awards and nominations

References

External links
 
 

Actresses in Malayalam cinema
Living people
Actresses from Kottayam
Indian film actresses
21st-century Indian actresses
1993 births